Atiqa Odho (born 12 February 1968
) is a Pakistani television and film actress, television host, and the namesake of her own founded cosmetics brand Odho cosmetics. She debuted in Anwar Maqsood's TV series. She is famous for, Sitara aur Mehrunissa and then appeared in dramas like Dasht, Nijaat, Harjaee and most recently in Humsafar. She later starred in a string of films, including Jo Darr Gya Woh Marr Gya, Mummy and Mujhe Chand Chahiye.

Early life and career
Born into a Sindhi family, the granddaughter of the sardar of Jacobabad, in 1968, she started her professional life as a make-up artist and hairstylist in 1989. While working as a make-up artist for various advertising agencies in Karachi, she was discovered by television personality, Anwar Maqsood. She starred in his play, Sitara Aur Mehrunissa in 1993. In 1995, she made her film debut in Jo Darr Gya Woh Marr Gya. Her latest role is as Mansura in Pyar Ke Sadqey.

In 2022, Atiqa Odho joins the Turkish drama Koyu Beyaz in which she will make her debut on the world stage.

Social work
Since 2016, she has also been engaged in philanthropic activities. She has been working for Shaukat Khanum Memorial Hospital, Fatmeed Foundation, and as a social worker in "Hamara Mulk, Hamaray Log". She is currently the CEO of Odho Cosmetics, and Odho Productions. She is also the ambassador for a campaign on awareness of breast cancer in Pakistan.
In June 2021, Atiqa has been elected as the chairperson of Actors Collective Trust that aims at the betterment of artist community.

Personal life

Marriages
Atiqa got her first marriage at the age of 15. She gave birth to her first daughter at the age of 16, and to a son at the age of 19. Her first marriage lasted for 6 years only.
Odho was again married to Javed Akhund at the age of 21 and had one daughter and a son. She gave birth to her son at the age of 29. Later in few years got divorced.
In July 2012, she got married with Samar Ali Khan for the third time.

The liquor case controversy
In June 2011, Odho was detained and then released shortly after, by the Airport Security Force at the Benazir Bhutto International Airport for allegedly carrying two liquor bottles in her luggage. After a court trial for 9 years, she was finally acquitted by a Rawalpindi civil court in August 2020.

Filmography

Films

Jo Darr Gya Woh Marr Gya (1995)
Mummy (1997)
Mujhe Chand Chahiye (2000)
Lahore Se Aagey (2016)
Dobara Phir Se (2016)
Chain Aye Na (2017)
Na Band Na Baraati (2018)
Kahay Dil Jidhar (2020)
Neelofar (TBD)

Television long-plays
Aaks: 1991 / PTV
Talaash: 1992 / PTV
Zikar Hay Kayi Saal Ka''': 1996 / PTVTu Laak Chalay Re Gorey : 2001 / PTVAab Yaha Koi Nahi Aye Ga: 2002/ Indus VisionBaykhabri: 2003 / Indus VisionMarium: 2004 / Indus VisionTum Intezar Karna: 2007 / Aaj TVChalo Phir Se Jee Lain: 2008 / Ary Digital
Abhi Tou Main Jawan Hoon: 2013 / PTV, Geo Entertainment
Main hu pyar tera: 2013 / HUM TV
Tum na miltay to: 2014 / HUM TV

Television serialsSitara Aur Mehrunissa (1992)Dasht (1993)Nijaat (1993)Talaash (1994)Angar Wadi (1994)Zikr Hai Kai Saal Ka (1995) Junoon (2000)Aan (2001)Kirchiyan (2002)Tum Hi To Ho (2002)Chahtain (2003)Umrao Jan Ada (2003)Nasl (2003)Harjai (2004)Dhool (2006)Karishmay (2007)Atiqa O (2008)Hum Tum (2010)Saans (2011)Humsafar (2011)Band Baje Ga (2012)Siskiyaan (2013)Ishq Samandar (2013)Aarzoo-Jeene Ki To Nahi (2013)Ghalti Se Mistake Ho Gai (2013)Dil hi to hai (2015)Nazo (2015)Mera Kya Qasoor Tha (2016)Khan (2017)Piyari Bittu (2017)Khatakaar (2018)Ro Raha Hai Dil (2018)Hania (2019)Pyar Ke Sadqay (2020)Pardes (2021)Angna (2022)Kaisi Teri Khudgarzi (2022)

Television shows
 Nestlé Nido Young Stars''
 Karishma
 Passion
 Let's Makeup
 In the spotlight with Atiqa Odho
 Aap ki bat Atiqa kay sath

Awards and recognition

See also 
 List of Pakistani actresses

References

External links 
 

Living people
Pakistani film actresses
Pakistani hairdressers
Pakistani make-up artists
Pakistani television actresses
Pakistani social workers
Nigar Award winners
Actresses from Karachi
20th-century Pakistani actresses
21st-century Pakistani actresses
Pakistani actor-politicians
Sindhi people
1958 births